Ceca 2000 is the tenth studio album by Serbian singer Ceca. It was released in 1999.

Lyrics: Lj.Jorgovanovic / M.Tucakovic

Track listing
Dokaz
Oproštajna večera
Crni sneg (featuring Aca Lukas)
Ja ću prva
Sviće dan
Već viđeno
Crveno
Brat i sestra
Votka sa utehom
Drugarice (featuring Luna)
Ako te ona odbije

References

1999 albums
Ceca (singer) albums